Open Wide may refer to:

Books
Open Wide: Tooth School Inside, book by American author and illustrator Laurie Keller

Music
"Open Wide", 2012 song by CLSM album Return to the Unexpected 
"Open Wide" (song), 2014 song by Calvin Harris featuring Big Sean
"Open Wide", 2005 song by Staind, as an additional track on the release "Right Here"